Tsagaanlamyn Dügersüren (1914-1986) was acting Chairman of the Presidium of the State Little Khural (acting titular head of state) of Mongolian People's Republic from May 20, 1972 to June 29, 1972 following the death of Jamsrangiin Sambuu.

External links
 Presidents of Mongolia

1986 deaths
1914 births
Communism in Mongolia
Mongolian communists
Presidents of Mongolia